Mahboob Ali Baig Sahib Bahadur Mahboob Ali Baig, also known as, was a politician from India. He was the member of Constituent Assembly of India from Madras since 14 July 1947 to 24 January 1950. He played a key role in making Muslim personal law Act 1937.

References 

Indian independence activists
Members of the Constituent Assembly of India